The Best Actor Award is an award presented at the Cannes Film Festival since 1946. It is given to an actor who has delivered an outstanding performance and chosen by the jury from the films in official competition slate at the festival. 

At the 1st Cannes Film Festival held in 1946, Ray Milland was the first winner of this award for his performance in The Lost Weekend, and Song Kang-ho is the most recent winner in this category for his role in Broker at the 75th Cannes Film Festival in 2022.

History
The award was first presented in 1946. The prize was not awarded on five occasions (1947, 1953–54, 1956, and 1960). The festival was not held at all in 1948, 1950, and 2020. In 1968, no awards were given as the festival was called off mid-way due to the May 1968 events in France. On four occasions, the jury has awarded multiple men (more than 2) the prize for one film. The four films were A Big Family (1955), Compulsion (1959), Long Day's Journey into Night (1962), and Days of Glory (2006). Dean Stockwell, Jack Lemmon, and Marcello Mastroianni have won the most awards in this category, each winning twice. The award can be for lead or supporting roles, with the exception of the period from 1979 to 1981, and in 1991, when the festival used to award a separate "Best Supporting Actor" prize. The jury also, on occasion, cites actors with a special citation that is separate from the main award.

Winners

Multiple winners 

The following individuals have received multiple Best Actor awards:

See also 
The following individuals have also received Best Actor award(s) at Venice or Berlin Film Festival.

Notes

A: This year the award was changed to Prix d'Interpretation (Acting Award), without gender differentiation. 
B: The entire male and female cast of A Big Family (Больша́я семья́) was recipient of this award in a tie with Spencer Tracy for Bad Day at Black Rock.
C: This year award was given as Prix Le Premier Regard Un Certain Regard (Premiere Award - Un Certain Regard) to the lead male and female cast of Long Day's Journey into Night and A Taste of Honey (ex aequo).

References

External links
 Cannes Film Festival official website
 Cannes Film Festival at IMDb .

Cannes Film Festival
 
Awards for male actors
Film awards for lead actor
Film awards for supporting actor
Cannes, Best Actor